Daniel W. "Hodge" Hodgson (born August 29, 1965) is a Canadian former professional ice hockey player of Cree heritage who played 114 National Hockey League games for the Toronto Maple Leafs and Vancouver Canucks. He won the Memorial Cup as a member of the Prince Albert Raiders in 1985. After his NHL career ended, he moved to Switzerland, where he played in the Nationalliga A from 1994 until his retirement in 2005.

Career statistics

Regular season and playoffs

International

Awards
 WHL East Second All-Star Team – 1984
 WHL East First All-Star Team – 1985

References

External links
 
 

1965 births
Canadian expatriate ice hockey players in Austria
Canadian expatriate ice hockey players in Germany
Canadian ice hockey centres
Cowichan Valley Capitals players
Fredericton Express players
EHC Basel players
EHC Lustenau players
HC Ajoie players
HC Davos players
HC Fribourg-Gottéron players
HC Thurgau players
Ice hockey people from Alberta
Lausanne HC players
Living people
Milwaukee Admirals (IHL) players
Newmarket Saints players
People from Mackenzie County
Prince Albert Raiders players
SCL Tigers players
Spokane Flyers players
St. Catharines Saints players
Toronto Maple Leafs draft picks
Toronto Maple Leafs players
Vancouver Canucks players
ZSC Lions players
Canadian expatriate ice hockey players in Switzerland
First Nations sportspeople
Canadian expatriate ice hockey players in the United States